(January 27, 1952 – February 27, 2005) was a Japanese film director. He won the award for Best Director at the 8th Yokohama Film Festival for Be-Bop-Highschool and Be-Bop-Highschool Kōkō yo Tarō aika.

Filmography
 Devilman (2004)
 Pinch Runner (2000)
 Jigoku-do reikai tsushin (1996)
 Rokudenashi blues (1996)
 Migimagari No Dandy (1989)
 Bee Bop highschool: Koko yotaro kanketsu-hen (1988)
 Bee Bop highschool: Koko yotaro ondo (1988)
 Bee Bop highschool: Koko yotaro kyoso-kyoku (1987)
  The Shinjuku Love Story (1987)
 Bee Bop highschool; Koko yotaro march (1987)
 Shinshi dômei (1986)
 Bee Bop highschool; Koko yotaro elegy (1986)
 Bee Bop High School (1985)
 Taboo X tôsaku (1985)
 Baajin nante kowakunai (1984)
 Rouge (1984)
 Ane nikki (1984)
 Bishôjo puroresu: shisshin 10-byo mae (1984)
 Sêrâ-fuku: Yurizoku 2 (1983)
 Sêrâ-fuku: Yurizoku (1983)
 Waisetsu kazoku: haha to musume (1982)

External links

References

1952 births
2005 deaths
Japanese film directors
People from Tokyo